Naryn Castle is a historical castle located in Ardabil County in Ardabil Province, This castle was destroyed during the reign of Reza Shah.

References 

Castles in Iran
Ruined castles in Iran